The Eucharistic Youth Movement (EYM) is an international Catholic educational movement oriented to youth, originated in 1915 in France as the Eucharistic Crusade, following the call of the International Eucharistic Congress of Lourdes to form "a great Eucharistic league of children". It began its pedagogical renewal in 1962, calling itself the Eucharistic Youth Movement. It is the youth branch of the Pope's Worldwide Prayer Network.

This movement is made up of young people from 5 to 18 years of age and is present in more than 59 countries. It finds its roots in the Pope’s Worldwide Prayer Network (Apostleship of Prayer) and is inspired by the Spiritual Exercises of St. Ignatius.

References

Associations of the Christian faithful
Eucharistic congresses
Youth movements